Belemnia trotschi is a moth of the subfamily Arctiinae first described by Herbert Druce in 1884. It is found in Panama and Costa Rica.

Adults have a unique colour, not looking like anything else in any tropical habitat known. It is a day-flying moth.

The larvae feed on Brosimum guianense.

References

External links
Rossano, Joseph. BOLD: Costa Rica. An art project in association with Barcode of Life Data System (BOLD).

Arctiini